The International Economic History Association (IEHA) is an association of national, regional, and international organizations dedicated to the field of economic history, broadly defined. The IEHA includes 45 member organizations in 40 countries around the world. Headquartered in Utrecht, Netherlands, the IEHA promotes the study of and facilitates collaboration on a variety of projects, publications, and initiatives. While the IEHA has origins in European historiographies (especially those of France and the United Kingdom), it has since expanded its scope and membership to include economies and scholars outside of traditional areas of research.

The IEHA is most well known for its triannual congress, the World Economic History Congress, an international and interdisciplinary event where over 1,000 economic historians convene each meeting to discuss trends in the field. Attendees of the conference include economists, historians, policymakers, heads of states, government ministers, and scholars of economic history.

History

Founding
At the height of the Cold War in 1960, the IEHA was founded to unite scholars in Western Europe, the United States, and the Soviet Union. Among economists there were concerns of spurring and sustaining economic growth in many economic history departments in the United Kingdom and the United States. Similarly, Alexander Gerschenkron sought to build on Rostow's stages of economic growth with his research on economic backwardness. At the same time, the founding of the IEHA originally stemmed from the work of Fernand Braudel and Immanuel Wallerstein on economic growth in early modern Europe. Throughout the twentieth century, the IEHA gradually grew in size and the number of papers presented.

In 1968, the member organizations of the IEHA convened for the first meeting outside of Europe. The fourth meeting met in Bloomington, Indiana, United States.

By 2012, the organization expanded its global approach to the discipline by hosting its first conference outside of Europe. Around 750 attendees from 55 countries attended the World Economic History Congress in Stellenbosch, South Africa. European scholars at the conference were more interested in the North-South divide, thus facilitating the developing of African economic history as a whole. The conference was, in part, organized by the African Agenda, and boosted tourism to the local community. Academics have noted that the hosting of the Congress in Stellenbosch positioned the country to become one of the leading cenrtres of economic history on the African continent. The opening address, delivered by Minister of Finance Pravin Gordhan, recognized the economic and political potential that the conference had for the South African economy.

The first Congress to convene in Asia took place in Kyoto, Japan in August 2015. Presentations focused less on European economies and more on Latin American and Asian economies. The meeting thus presented an important moment, not just for economic history, but also for global history. The conference led to the publication of Jörg Baten's A History of the Global Economy: 1500 to the Present (2016) that, according to one reviewer "was commissioned by the International Economic History Association and the editor states that his aim is to organize a 'non-Eurocentric history' that presents 'economic history in a balanced way.'"

In recent years, the organization has returned its focus to present-day questions. In 2018, President Anne McCants spoke of the importance of understanding globalization: its origins, its effects on inequality, and the importance of big data. At the congress, held in Boston, Massachusetts French economist Thomas Piketty (École des hautes études en sciences sociales) and author of Capital in the Twenty-First Century described the World Economic History Congress as “one of the few places in the world where economists and historians talk to each other, and we truly need this interdisciplinary approach.” The IEHA produces an annual bulletin of conferences and meetings for economic historians.

Leadership
Former Presidents of the IEHA include:
 1965–1968: Frederic Chapin Lane
 1968–1974: Kristof Glamann
 1974–1978: Peter Mathias
 1978–1982: Zsigmond Pál Pach
 1982–1986: Jean-François Bergier 
 1986–1990: Herman Van der Wee 
 1994–1998: Gabriel Tortella 
 1998–2002: Roberto Cortés Conde
 2002–2006: Richard Sutch
 2006–2009: Riitta Hjerppe
 2012–2015: Grietjie Verhoef
 2015–2018: Tetsuji Okazaki
 2018–2021: Anne McCants

Former Secretary Generals of the IEHA include: 
 1998–2006: Jan Luiten van Zanden
 2006–2012: Jörg Baten
 2012–2015: Debin Ma
 2018–2021: Jari Eloranta

Organization
The IEHA comprises three bodies. The General Assembly includes one representative from each member organization. The Executive Committee oversees the execution of decisions made by the General Assembly, and the Local Organizing Committees are responsible for running the World Economic History Congress.

Membership
The IEHA comprises 45 member organizations, including the following.

World Economic History Congress
Every four years (and every three years since 2006), the IEHA hosts a World Economic History Congress (WEHC) on a particular topic in economic history. The meetings aim to bring together scholars who focus on to discuss present-day debates in the discipline. Past meetings include: The initial meetings were titled the International Conference and held in western European countries. The fifth meeting was held in Leningrad, Russia and, by the eighth meeting in Budapest, Hungary, the name was changed to the International Economic History Congress. The latter had over 850 economic historians from 88 countries participate. Its goal was to promote regulate debates in the international community of scholars. In 1994, the Eleventh International Economic History Congress in Milan, Italy had over 1,100 participants from more than 50 countries. The Congress has also been vital for the development of quantitative economic history, also known as cliometrics.

See also 
 Economic History Association
 Economic History Society

Further reading
 Paul Bairoch, Economics and World History: Myths and Paradoxes (Chicago, USA: University of Chicago Press, 1995)
 Maxine Berg, "East-West Dialogues: Economic Historians, the Cold War, and Détente." The Journal of Modern History 87, no. 1 (2015): 36–71. doi:10.1086/680261.
 Rondo E. Cameron, A Concise Economic History of the World" From Paleolithic Times to the Present (Oxford, UK: Oxford University Press, 1997)
 Donald N. McCloskey, If You're So Smart: The Narrative of Economic Expertise (Chicago, USA: University of Chicago Press, 1992)
 S.A.J. Parsons and G. Chandler, How to Find Out About Economics: The Commonwealth and International Library: Libraries and Technical Information Division (Elsevier Science, 2014)

References 

Professional associations based in the Netherlands
Economic history societies
History of business
History of technology
Economic history journals
History journals
Organizations established in 1960